Days of Atonement is the second crime novel by Michael G Jacob and Daniela De Gregorio writing under the name of Michael Gregorio. Like its predecessor, Critique of Criminal Reason, it is set in East Prussia during the height of Napoleonic wars, and once again chronicles the attempts of magistrate Hanno Stiffeniis to solve a murder mystery.

2007 British novels
British crime novels
Novels set during the Napoleonic Wars
Faber and Faber books